City Centre ward was a ward of the local authority Manchester City Council from 2004 to 2018. The population of the city centre grew significantly in the 21st century. Therefore as recommended by the Local Government Boundary Commission for England (LGBCE), the ward was replaced in May 2018 with two new electoral wards, Deansgate and Piccadilly.

It is represented in Westminster by Lucy Powell Labour Co-op MP for Manchester Central.

Councillors 

 indicates seat up for re-election.
 indicates ward abolished and replaced by Deansgate and Piccadilly.

Elections in 2010s

May 2016

May 2015

May 2014

May 2012

May 2011

May 2010

Elections in 2000s

References



Manchester City Council Wards